Can You Feel the Force? is a song by British soul group The Real Thing, released as a single on 26 January 1979. It was written by band members Chris Amoo and his brother Eddie Amoo, and produced by Ken Gold for Tony Hall Productions and mastered at Sterling Sound. The song was the group's biggest disco hit, reaching number five in the UK Singles Chart and spending 11 weeks in the top 75, and also charting in a number of other countries. In March 1979 it was certified silver by the BPI for shipments of 250,000 copies.

In 1986 the song was remixed by Bob Mallett and charted again in the UK and Ireland.

Charts

Weekly charts
Original version

'86 Mix

Year-end charts
Original version

References

1979 singles
1979 songs
1986 singles
British pop songs
Disco songs
Pye Records singles
The Real Thing (British band) songs